Katherine O'Connor (born 12 December 2000) is an Irish track and field athlete, who competes in the heptathlon and indoor pentathlon.

O'Connor competed for Northern Ireland at the 2018 Commonwealth Games, finishing eighth in the heptathlon.

She won a silver in the heptathlon at the 2019 European Athletics U20 Championships in Borås, Sweden.

O’Connor won a silver medal at the 2022 Commonwealth Games on August 3rd competing in the heptathlon.

Personal life
O'Connor will begin a course of study at the University of Texas in 2019.

References

External links

Living people
2000 births
Sportspeople from Newry
Sportspeople from County Louth
Irish heptathletes
Irish pentathletes
Athletes (track and field) at the 2018 Commonwealth Games
Commonwealth Games competitors for Northern Ireland
Pentathletes from Northern Ireland
Commonwealth Games silver medallists for Northern Ireland
Commonwealth Games medallists in athletics
Athletes (track and field) at the 2022 Commonwealth Games
Medallists at the 2022 Commonwealth Games